Saint-Léopardin-d'Augy is a commune in the Allier department in Auvergne-Rhône-Alpes in central France.

History
The commune is a result of the fusion of two previous towns (each from a parish of the Old Regime), St. Léopardin and Augy, by order of King Louis Philippe on June 18, 1843. During the French Revolution, the commune was called Vivier.

The name of St. Léopardin comes from that of a hermit, saint Léopardin, whose life seems just as legendary as that of St. Menoux. The priory of St. Léopardin is built where the hermit had lived.

Geography
The town is bordered by two rivers: the Allier, in the northeast and north, which forms its boundary with Chantenay-Saint-Imbert and Livry, and Burge, in the east, tributary of the Allier, which forms most of its border with the town of Aubigny.

Population

See also
Communes of the Allier department

References

Communes of Allier
Allier communes articles needing translation from French Wikipedia